Sushil Finance Group is among the oldest Indian broking houses being associated with the Bombay Stock Exchange (BSE) as well as the National Stock Exchange (NSE).  Established in 1982 Sushil Finance Group has its headquarters located in Mumbai, the capital city of the Indian state of Maharashtra.

Led by Sushil N. Shah, the diversified financial services group has grown as one of the leading broking houses in India.  It has long been recognized in the industry for its franchise model through which it helps budding investors to set up partnership businesses.  The Group is empanelled with more than 50 financial institutions and banks, and has more than 600 franchisees across the country. 
 
Sushil Finance's expertise lies in comprehensive market research and has more than 50 research products under its brand.  This enables the Group to offer advice across segments like IPOs, mutual funds, equities, currencies and fixed income.  Analysts at Sushil Finance emphasize on showing the real picture of the stock market.  Senior research analysts associated with Sushil Finance are often featured in leading dailies and news portals.

In 2012, the Group had launched an independent insurance arm called Sushil Insurance Brokers Private Limited (SIBPL) to cater to the insurance needs of prospective investors.  Besides, the Group has released a slew of investment related products, which cater to investors with low risk appetite.

Sushil Finance group of companies
 Sushil Financial Services Private Limited
 Sushil Finance Consultants Limited
 Sushil Capital Private Limited
 Sushil Insurance Brokers Private limited

References

External links
 
 Sushil Finance at The Economic Times.
 "sushil financial services" at Rediff Realtime News Search.
 Budget Reactions: Govt eye on revenue offers no tax benefits: Sushil Finance at moneycontrol.com.

Financial services companies based in Mumbai
Financial services companies established in 1982
1982 establishments in Maharashtra